Florian Beck (born 7 January 1958) is a German former alpine skier who competed in the 1984 Winter Olympics and 1988 Winter Olympics.

Career
During his career he has achieved 6 results among the top 10 (1 podium) in the World Cup.

World Cup results
Top 10

References

External links
 
 

1958 births
Living people
German male alpine skiers
Olympic alpine skiers of West Germany
Alpine skiers at the 1984 Winter Olympics
Alpine skiers at the 1988 Winter Olympics
20th-century German people